Bajram Kosumi (born 20 March 1960, in Kosova, Kamenica , is 
a Kosovar politician who served as the third prime minister of Kosovo for nearly one year.  He was nominated by Kosovan President Ibrahim Rugova and elected Prime Minister by the Kosovo Parliament on 23 March 2005 following his predecessor Ramush Haradinaj's . Kosumi resigned on 1 March 2006 amid widespread unpopularity and was replaced by former general leader Agim Çeku.  He also served as the deputy chairman of the Alliance for the Future of Kosovo.

Family and life
He is married and has four children. He lives in Pristina and Kamenica.

Education
He graduated in Philology and has a Master's Degree in Albanian Literature from the University of Pristina. In 2008 he became a Doctor of Philology

Past and present activities and functions
Kosumi is a veteran figure on Kosovo's political scene. He was a student activist and in March 1981 was sentenced to 15 years in jail for taking part in demonstrations against the government. He served almost ten years of his sentence before being released in 1991.

From 1991 until 1993 he worked as a journalist.

In 1993, Kosumi became president of the Parliamentary Party of Kosovo. He is a quiet, cerebral politician, who took part in the Rambouillet talks in early 1999, prior to the Kosovo War. Kosumi was a supporter of the Kosovo Liberation Army (KLA) insurgency, but he did not take up arms or wear the uniform. He did serve as minister of information in the provisional government of Kosovo.

He is currently deputy chairman of the Alliance for the Future of Kosovo, the third largest political party in Kosovo. From December 2004 until he became the third post-war Prime Minister of Kosovo, Kosumi was the Minister for Environment and Spatial Planning of the Government of Kosovo.

Published books

Bajram Kosumi has also published a number of books.
 “Book of Liberty” (Albanian: Libri i lirisë)  (1991), Pristina.
 “A Concept on Sub-Policy” (1995), Pristina.
 “Vocabulary of Barbarians” (2000), Pristina.
 “A Concept on the New Political Thought” (2001), Pristina.
 “Fishta's Lyric” (Albanian: Lirika e Fishtës)  (1994), Tirana.

Notes

References

References:

External links
 Bajram Kosumi, member of the Assembly of Kosovo.
 BBC News article "Kosovo prime minister steps down"

1960 births
Living people
Prime ministers of Kosovo
Kosovo Albanians
Alliance for the Future of Kosovo politicians
People from Kamenica, Kosovo